Bluewater District School Board (known as English-language Public District School Board No. 7 prior to 1999) is a school board in the Canadian province of Ontario, with jurisdiction for the operation of schools in Bruce and Grey Counties.

Its head office is located in Chesley, in the Municipality of Arran-Elderslie of Bruce County.

Bluewater District School Board has approximately 16,500 students in 41 elementary schools and nine secondary schools. The BWDSB has approximately 3,000 permanent and casual staff, including teachers. There are nine elected trustees on the board and one appointed First Nations trustee.

Early years of education in Bruce and Grey

Bruce County
The county's first school was established in Kincardine in 1851, followed by Southampton and Walkerton in 1852. At that time, the United Counties of Huron and Bruce comprised one school district, but Bruce County would receive its own superintendent in 1853, and the county itself would be divided into three school districts in 1855:

The first grammar school would be established at Kincardine in 1860, followed by others in Walkerton (1872), Wiarton (1892) and Chesley (1904). Model schools would be formed in 1877 for the training of teachers, at Kincardine and Walkerton. 

In the 50 years to 1901, the network of schools had grown to the following size:

Grey County
After an initial division into three school districts in November 1854, Grey County was reorganized into four districts two years later:

Owen Sound established its first primary school in the early 1840s, and its grammar school in 1856.

Schools in 1960
The Ontario Department of Education reported in 1960 that the school network in Bruce and Grey consisted of the following:

County and district reorganizations (1969 and 1999)
The Bruce County Board of Education  and the Grey County Board of Education were constituted at the beginning of 1969, as a result of legislation passed by the Legislative Assembly of Ontario in 1968.

As part of the province-wide restructuring of Ontario's school boards as a consequence of the passage of the Fewer School Boards Act, 1997, the "English-language Public District School Board No. 7" was created to take over the schools of the former county boards. It was merged with the former boards at the beginning of 1998, and was renamed as the "Bluewater District School Board" in 1999.

Athletics of the Bluewater District School Board 

Sports at the secondary level are played through the Bluewater Athletics Association. They are offered at high schools in the BWDSB and the Bruce-Grey Catholic District School Board. The winning team (BAA Champions) will go onto a CWOSSA Tournament.
The following sports are played through BAA:

Volleyball
Football
Gymnastics
Basketball
Tennis
Soccer
Badminton
Wrestling
Rugby
Swim Team
Cross Country
Curling
Hockey
Golf
Nordic Skiing
Track and Field

Student Senate
From each high school in the BWDSB, a representative or student senator goes to monthly meetings at the school board office in Chesley, Ontario and brings ideas and suggestions from their school. They are a part of the Student Senate.

In May 2012, the Student Senate held their first conference, "SOS (Support Our Students) - Voices and Choices" in Owen Sound, Ontario with a focus on student mental health. A sequel titled, "Rumour Has It", followed in May 2013.

Organization of schools

Fraser Institute rankings
The 2020 Fraser Institute report on comparative secondary school rankings in Ontario gives the following data for Bluewater:

Further reading

See also
List of school districts in Ontario
List of high schools in Ontario

References

External links
 Bluewater District School Board official website

School districts in Ontario
Education in Bruce County
Education in Grey County